Abhishek Bajaj (born 24 October 1992)  is an Indian actor known for starring in the film Student of the Year 2 in the year 2019 and playing the role of Sandy in film  titled Chandigarh Kare Aashiqui.

Early life and career 
Bajaj was born on Saturday, October 24, 1992 and studied in New Delhi, India. Started his career as a model and later got a break in Sony TV's Parvarrish – Kuchh Khattee Kuchh Meethi and became famous for playing the role of Rahul in the serial Dil De Ke Dekho which aired on Sab TV. He has worked in many television shows like Ek Nanad ki Khushiyon ki Chabhi Meri Bhabhi (Star Plus), Bitti Business Wali, Dil De Ke Dekho, Silsila Pyaar Ka, Santoshi Maa, Zindagi Ke Crossroads and others.

He debuted in Bollywood with Karan Johar's Student of the Year 2 (2019) starring Tiger Shroff, Tara Sutaria, Ananya Panday where he played the character of Abhishek Sharma. He has also done a comedy web series named Boys With Toys.

His latest film The Coin co-starring Vivaan Shah, Zoya Afroz was released on OTT platform in the year  2021.

Filmography

Films

Television

References

External links

 

1992 births
Living people
Indian male television actors
21st-century Indian male actors
Male actors in Hindi cinema
Male actors from Delhi